Cowwarr is a closed station located in the town of Cowwarr, on the Maffra railway line in Victoria, Australia.

History
The station opened in 1883 with the construction of the line from Traralgon to Heyfield and was 184 km from Southern Cross.

A telegraph office operated at the station from around 1910 to 1916. In 1915, there was a derailment that occurred at the station. In 1927, the amount of revenue derived from the station was £3984. The station closed in 1986.

References

Disused railway stations in Victoria (Australia)
Transport in Gippsland (region)
Shire of Wellington